The People's Democratic Party (PDP), renamed as Christian Democracy (DC) from March 1988 until it merged into the People's Party in June 1989, was a Christian-democratic political party in Spain.

History

In August 1982, 13 deputies under the leadership of Óscar Alzaga split from the Union of the Democratic Centre (UCD) and founded the PDP, entering into alliance with the People's Alliance (AP), which received the second largest number of votes in the 1982 and 1986 general elections.
The party President was Óscar Alzaga until 1987, then Javier Rupérez led the party into a merger with AP and PL. Jaime Mayor Oreja, subsequently a leading PP politician, was a leading member of PDP.

The PDP was a member of the European People's Party from 1986 onwards.

In 1988 the party was renamed as "Christian Democracy" (Democracia Cristiana). In 1989 the party, along with the Popular Alliance and the Liberal Party (PL), merged with others to create the new People's Party (PP).

Electoral performance

Cortes Generales

European Parliament

See also
:Category:People's Democratic Party (Spain) politicians

References

External links
Party registration, El Pais, 9 July 1982

Union of the Democratic Centre (Spain)
Christian political parties
Political parties established in 1982
Political parties disestablished in 1989
Catholic political parties
1982 establishments in Spain
1989 disestablishments in Spain